The 1950 Senior Bowl was a college football exhibition game featuring players from the 1949 college football season and prospects in the 1950 NFL Draft. The inaugural edition of the Senior Bowl was played on January 7, 1950, at Gator Bowl Stadium in Jacksonville, Florida. The teams were coached by personnel from the National Football League (NFL); Bo McMillin of the Detroit Lions for the North, and Steve Owen of the New York Giants for the South. The game was broadcast on the Mutual Radio Network. After the North took an early 13–0 lead, the South came from behind for a 22–13 victory. South quarterback Travis Tidwell of Auburn completed 13 of 19 passes for 246 yards and was named game MVP.

The day after the game, it was announced that eight players from the Southwestern Conference (SWC) who had participated in the game would lose their scholarships; although each had completed their college sports career, they had not yet completed their college studies. The SWC schools ended the players' scholarships because they had accepted payment for appearing in the Senior Bowl, with each of the 26 players on the winning team receiving $475 and each of the 24 players on the losing team receiving $343,  coming from 60 percent of the ticket sales. While the players accepted payment knowing that their scholarships could be ended, Senior Bowl organizer Jimmy Pearre pointed out that the colleges "have made millions off these players". The players and their college teams were:
 Arkansas: Theron Roberts
 Baylor: J. D. Ison, Rupert Wright
 SMU: Jack Halliday, Dick McKissack, Doak Walker
 Texas: Ray Borneman, Paul Campbell

This would prove to be the only edition of the Senior Bowl played in Jacksonville, as the game moved to Mobile, Alabama, in 1951 and has remained there since. In 1994, Gator Bowl Stadium was closed and demolished; it was replaced with Jacksonville Municipal Stadium, now known as TIAA Bank Field.

Game summary

References

Further reading

Senior Bowl
Senior Bowl
Senior Bowl
Senior Bowl